Alexey V. Kavokin (born 7 March 1970 in Leningrad) is a Russian and French theoretical physicist and writer.

He is an expert in solid state optics and semiconductor physics.

Life
He graduated from the Saint Petersburg Polytechnical University in 1991. He was a member of staff of the Ioffe Physico-Technical institute (1992 – 2000). He graduated from the Ioffe Physico-Technical institute in 1993, with a PhD in physics and mathematics, supervisor Prof. E.L. Ivchenko. He was a professor at the Blaise Pascal University (Clermont-Ferrand, France, 1998 – 2005). He is a professor at the University of Southampton (Southampton, United Kingdom, 2005 – 2018). In July 2010, he co-founded the Mediterranean Institute of Fundamental Physics with the support of Dr. Giuseppe Eramo and was appointed scientific director. In 2018, he joined has joined the Westlake University (Hangzhou, China) as a Chair Professor and Director of the International Center for Polaritonics.

He is the brother of Physicist Kirill Kavokin. He is married, with 4 children.

Prizes and awards
 Headliner Award 2020, for the research on quantum computers based on liquid light.
 E.F. Gross Medal for defining contribution into development of modern Polaritonics: physics of light-matter coupling in semiconductor nano- and microstructures, 2020.
 ISCS 2020 Quantum Devices Award.
 Honorary professor of the Vladimir State university, 2017
 Doctor Honoris Causa of the Russian-Armenian University, Erevan, Armenia, 2017
 Established Career Fellowship by EPSRC, UK 2012.
 Winner of the “Megagrant” of the Russian Ministry of Science and Education, 2011.
 Chairholder of the Marie Curie Chair of Excellence in Polaritonics, Rome, Tor Vergata, 2006.
 Prize of the Scientific Council of A.F. Ioffe Institute for the Best Scientific Work of the year 1998 for “Observation of above-barrier exciton states” (with M.E. Sasin and R.P. Seisyan).
 Prize of the Scientific Council of A.F. Ioffe Institute for the Best Scientific Work of the year 1996 for “Theory of exciton magnetic polarons” (with K.V. Kavokin and I.A. Merkulov).

Other responsibilities
Program Chairman: Forum “Science of the Future”, Sevastopol, 2015, Kazan 2016, Nizhniy Novgorod 2017

Member of Evaluation panel: Institut Universitaire de France, 2010, 2011

Expert of the French ANR program: 2009-2017, Horizon 2020: 2015-2017

Member of Material Science Panel for evaluation of CNR Laboratories (Italy), Since 2009

Editor of the “Superlattices and Microstructures”, Elsevier since 2016

Referee for the journals: Nature, Science, Physical Review Letters and others

Publications

Scientific output
> 450 publications in peer reviewed international scientific journals: 1 in Science, 2 in Nature, 3 in Nature Physics, 4 in Nature Photonics, 1 in Nature Materials, 4 in Nature Communications, 2 in PNAS, 2 in Light: Science and Applications, 1 in Nano Letters, 2 in Physical Review X, 46 in Physical Review Letters, 98 in Physical Review B, 10 in Applied Physics Letters, 4 Topical Reviews, 19787 citations (Dec. 2020). h = 55 (Web of Science), h = 70 (Google scholar).

The most important publications
 S. Hoefling and A.V. Kavokin, A historic experiment redesigned, Nature, 514, 313-314 (2014).
 A. A. High, J. R. Leonard, A. T. Hammack, M. M. Fogler, L. V. Butov, A. V. Kavokin, K. L. Campman & A. C. Gossard, Spontaneous coherence in a cold exciton gas, Nature, 483, 584 (2012).
 E.Wertz, L. Ferrier, D. D. Solnyshkov, R. Johne, D. Sanvitto, A. Lemaître I. Sagnes, R. Grousson, A. V. Kavokin, P. Senellart, G. Malpuech and J. Bloch, Spontaneous formation and optical manipulation of extended polariton condensates, Nature Physics, 6, 860 (2010).
 K. Lagoudakis, T. Ostatnicky, A.V. Kavokin, Y.G. Rubo, R. Andre, and B. Deveaud-Pledran, Observation of Half-Quantum Vortices in an Exciton-Polariton Condensate, Science, 326, 974 (2009). 
 S. Christopoulos, G. Baldassarri von Högersthal, A. J. Grundy, P. G. Lagoudakis, A. V. Kavokin, J. J. Baumberg, G. Christmann, R. Butté, E. Feltin, J.-F. Carlin, and N. Grandjean, Room-Temperature Polariton Lasing in Semiconductor Microcavities, Phys. Rev. Lett. 98, 126405 (2007). 
 C. Leyder, M. Romanelli, J.Ph. Karr, E. Giacobino, T.C.H. Liew, M.M. Glazov, A.V. Kavokin, G. Malpuech, A. Bramati, A., Observation of the optical spin Hall effect, Nature Physics 3, 628 (2007). 
 I.A. Shelykh, Yuri G. Rubo, G. Malpuech, D. D. Solnyshkov, and A. Kavokin, Polarization and Propagation of Polariton Condensates, Phys. Rev. Lett. 97, 066402 (2006). 
 M. Richard, J. Kasprzak, R. Andre, R. Romestein, Le Si Dang, G. Malpuech, and A.V. Kavokin, Experimental evidence for non-equilibrium Bose condensation of exciton-polaritons, Phys. Rev. B, 72, 201301 (2005). 
 A. Kavokin, G. Malpuech, and M. Glazov, Optical Spin Hall Effect, Phys. Rev. Lett. 95, 136601 (2005). 
 F. P. Laussy, G. Malpuech, A. Kavokin, and P. Bigenwald, Spontaneous Coherence Buildup in a Polariton Laser, Phys. Rev. Lett. 93, 016402 (2004). 
 T.V. Shubina,S.V. Ivanov,V. N. Jmerik, D. D. Solnyshkov,V. A. Vekshin, P. S. Kop’ev, A. Vasson, J. Leymarie, A. Kavokin, H. Amano, K. Shimono, A. Kasic and B. Monemar, Mie Resonances, Infrared Emission, and the Band Gap of InN, Phys. Rev. Lett. 92, 117407 (2004). 
 G. Malpuech, A. Kavokin, A. Di Carlo and J.J. Baumberg, Polariton lasing by exciton-electron scattering in semiconductor microcavities, Phys. Rev. B 65, 153310 (2002).

Research monographs

Novel
 "Saladin the Cat" (in Russian, ERA, Moscow, 2006)

References

External links
Alexey Kavokin's website
List of publications of Alexey Kavokin (1991-2000)

Living people
20th-century Russian physicists
Scientists from Saint Petersburg
Russian expatriates in the United Kingdom
1970 births
21st-century French physicists
20th-century French physicists